Rich Man, Poor Man may refer to:

 A line from the traditional counting poem "Tinker, Tailor"
 Rich Man, Poor Man (film), a lost 1918 American silent romantic drama
 Rich Man, Poor Man (novel), a 1969 novel by Irwin Shaw
 Rich Man, Poor Man (miniseries), a 1976 miniseries based on the novel
 Rich Man, Poor Man Book II, a sequel miniseries
 "Rich Man, Poor Man", a song by Peter, Paul and Mary from the album Late Again

See also
 Rich Man, Poor Girl, a 1938 American comedy film 
 Rich man and Lazarus, a parable of Jesus in the Gospel of Luke